Do or Die: Diary 1982 is an album chronicling Nico's European tour from January 18 to March 28, 1982. It features songs from Nico's albums The Marble Index, Desertshore, The End... and Drama of Exile, which include covers of the Velvet Underground, David Bowie and the Doors.

It was originally released on cassette in November 1982 by 1/2 Records under the title 1982 Diary (as a matched set with the cassette En Personne En Europe – later reissued on CD as Femme Fatale by Jungle Records) and later reissued under a handful of different titles, including Nico Sings the Void. It was released on compact disc by Danceteria in 1987 under the title Do or Die (using the ROIR reissue title) and later reissued by ROIR US with a different cover on March 30, 2000.

Track listing
All songs written by Nico, unless otherwise noted.

"Janitor of Lunacy" — 4:02
"All Tomorrow's Parties" (Reed) — 4:44
"Sãeta" (Nico, Quilichini) — 4:19
"Sãeta" (Nico, Quilichini) — 2:56
"Vegas" — 3:13
"No One Is There" — 4:02
"Innocent and Vain" — 2:23
"Secret Side" — 3:43
"Procession" — 3:06
"Heroes" (Bowie, Eno) — 5:52
"Femme Fatale" (Reed) — 3:03
"All Tomorrow's Parties" (Reed) — 2:43
"I'm Waiting for the Man" (Reed) — 6:30
"The End" (Morrison, Krieger, Manzarek, Densmore) — 8:13

Tracks 1, 2 and 13 recorded at Teatro Nuova Medica in Bologna, Italy on March 28, 1982
Track 3, 5 recorded in Rotterdam, Netherlands on March 7, 1982
Track 4 recorded at a Piccadilly Radio session in Manchester, England in January 1982
Tracks 6, 8, 12 and 14 recorded at Saltlagertet in Copenhagen, Denmark on February 14, 1982
Tracks 7, 9 and 11 recorded in London, England on January 18, 1982
Track 10 recorded in Amsterdam, Netherlands on March 6, 1982
Tracks 5 and 10 are in mono, and other tracks in stereo

Personnel
 Nico – vocal, harmonium
 Samarkand :
 Mahamad Hadi - 1/4 tone synth guitar, dilruba
 Vasken Solakian - Kemantche, Tar
Blue Orchids:
Martin Bramah – guitar, backing vocals
Rick Goldstraw – guitar
Una Baines – keyboards
Steve Garvey: bass, backing vocals
Toby Toman – drums

Produced and engineered by Phil Rainford
Mastered by Dave Greatbanks
Compiled by Nigel Bagley
Digitally remastered by Pomeroy Audio (January 2000)

Reviews

AllMusic has called Do or Die one of the "finest" documents of a Nico live concert, noting that the songs "are drawn from almost every phase of her career, essentially lining up as the definitive 'greatest hits' album Nico is still awaiting."

References

1982 live albums
Nico albums
ROIR live albums